Kalashem-e Bala (also Romanized as Kalāshem-e Bālā and Kalāshom-e Bālā; also known as Kalashem, Kalāshom, Kalāshom-e Pā’īn, and Qalashem) is a village in Molla Sara Rural District, in the Central District of Shaft County, Gilan Province, Iran. At the 2006 census, its population was 1,928, in 523 families.

References 

Populated places in Shaft County